J. Randall O'Brien is the twenty-second president of Carson-Newman College in Jefferson City, Tennessee.  The Board of Trustees unanimously elected him in July 2008.  O'Brien succeeded Dr. James Netherton, who resigned in May 2007.  He was inaugurated on October 30, 2009, after assuming administrative duties on January 1, 2009.  O'Brien came to Carson-Newman from Baylor University where he was executive vice-president and provost.  He was a popular theology professor, and received many teaching awards during his tenure at Baylor.

During an interview in January 2009 with the Knoxville News-Sentinel, O'Brien identified five priorities to help make Carson-Newman become the "top Christian university in the world": clarify and fulfill the mission and vision, visionary leadership, accountable management, relationship building, and fundraising.   Since taking over as president, O'Brien was awarded the George W. Truett Distinguished Church Service Award by Baylor University's Alumni Association.  The award honors those connected to Baylor who demonstrate Truett's love of Christ and churches.

Biography
O'Brien is a native of McComb, Mississippi, and graduate of Mississippi College.  He received his doctor of theology degree from New Orleans Baptist Theological Seminary in 1982, and a master of sacred theology from Yale University Divinity School in 1987.  O'Brien was a full-time pastor most recently at Calvary Baptist Church in Little Rock, Arkansas, from 1987-1991. O'Brien has written many articles and books on theology.  His most recent book is Set Free By Forgiveness: The Way to Peace and Healing published in 2005.  O'Brien and his wife, Kay Donaho O'Brien, a social work professor, have two married daughters, Alyson Elise Tilson married to Sean Tilson and Shannon Evans, married to Eric Evans. Shannon and Eric have two sons, Alyosha Daniel and Moses Emannuel. O'Brien also has a son named Kris. He served in Vietnam in the 101st Airborne Division and received the Bronze Star and United States Air Medal.

References

External links 
  Carson-Newman College Website
  C-N Office of the President Website

Living people
Heads of universities and colleges in the United States
Recipients of the Air Medal
People from McComb, Mississippi
Year of birth missing (living people)